Iron Horse Park is a miniature ridable railway running multiple large scales operated by The Alberta Model Engineering Society. Iron horse park is one of the largest  gauge railways in Canada. Run by volunteers, the park promotes education regarding the engineering surrounding railways, including both modern and old steam engines. The site offers "journeys" including 1/8th scale simulated trip from Airdrie to Vancouver, through Tunnel / Sacred Buffalo Guardian Mountain in the Rocky Mountains. 

The park is located in Airdrie, Alberta, on land leased from the city to be used as an educational park. The history goes back to 1971 and has moved around Southern Alberta. Previously the raised track was located at Camp Gardner, Alberta.

The park is open yearly on Sundays from May long weekend to Canadian Thanksgiving weekend, with occasional other special event days.

Scales include:
 Large (over 1.6 km) 7.5 in ground mounted track with switches 
 Smaller (900ft) of 1-1/4 in, 2-1/2 in, 3-1/2 in, 4-3/4 in, 5 in, and 7-1/4 in elevated track gauges

References

External links
 

7½ in gauge railways in Canada
Airdrie, Alberta
1971 establishments in Alberta